The San Francisco Independent Film Festival, known as IndieFest, is an annual film festival, held in January or February, that recognizes contemporary independent film. It is run by SF IndieFest, a nonprofit organization, and based at the Roxie Theater in the Mission District.

History
The San Francisco Independent Film Festival was founded in 1998 by Jeff Ross, operations manager of the San Francisco International Film Festival and office manager of the San Francisco Film Society, at the end of a decade when independent films had increased in importance. The impetus was that San Francisco independent filmmaker Rand Alexander was unable to find a venue in the city to show Caged, which had premiered at the Slamdance Film Festival. The first festival took place in January 1999 and comprised 20 films, with a focus on experimental and otherwise unconventional works. The second IndieFest was held in January 2000, expanding from four days to nine, and the festival has continued to take place in January or February and further expanded to two weeks. The 2000 IndieFest added cartoon shorts; in 2002, despite losing corporate sponsorship in the wake of 9/11, the festival added foreign films. Ross directed the festival alone until a program director, Bruce Fletcher, was added.

IndieFest is now based at the Roxie Theater in the Mission District; it began at the Victoria, also in the Mission, and has used other Bay Area theaters including the United Artists Galaxy, the Castro Theatre, the Brava, the Alamo Drafthouse, the Lumiere, and the Fine Arts Cinema in Berkeley. It has become known for the associated parties, particularly the Big Lebowski party. The 20th IndieFest, in 2018, included a film from each previous festival. The 2021 festival, held during the COVID-19 pandemic, was streamed. The 2022 festival had a mix of screenings at the Roxie and virtual events.

Associated events
SF IndieFest also runs the spin-off film festivals DocFest, the SF Documentary Film Festival, started in 2001, Another Hole in the Head, a horror and science fiction festival started in 2003, the San Francisco Independent Short Film Festival, started in 2019, and the Livable Planet Festival, which was launched in 2021 as a replacement for the San Francisco Green Film Festival, which folded after the COVID-19 pandemic forced cancellation of the 2020 festival, and was rebranded in 2022 as the Green Film Festival of San Francisco. The first Decibels Music Film Festival took place in fall 2021 at the Roxie and online. Past associated festivals included the Northern California Action Sports Film Festival and the US edition of the International Short Film Festival. A week-long Winter Music Fest was added in 2010, taking place the week before the film festival; starting in 2011, it ran concurrently and the number of music-related films was increased. Ross also started A Mighty Ruckus, a rock festival.

Film categories
The San Francisco Independent Film Festival has separate film entry categories for general entrants and for Bay Area filmmakers. Both have sub-categories for length (features and shorts) and genre (narrative fiction, documentary, and animation).

Awards
The SF IndieFest awards panel confers the following awards:

 Audience Award for Best Feature Drama
 Audience Award for Best Feature Comedy
 Audience Award for Best Feature Documentary
 Audience Award for Best Short Drama
 Audience Award for Best Short Comedy
 Audience Award for Best Short Documentary
 Audience Award for Best Animated Short
 Audience Award for Best Midnight Movie
 Jury Prize for Best Narrative Feature
 Jury Prize for Best Documentary Feature
 Jury Prize for Best Narrative Short
 Jury Prize for Best Documentary Short
 Jury Prize for Best Animated Short
 Screenplay Competition Best Feature Script
 Screenplay Competition Best Short Script
 Vanguard Award, recognizing "unconventional, creative risk-taking filmmakers that are redefining the cinematic form"

References

Documentary film festivals in the United States
Film festivals in the San Francisco Bay Area
Film festivals established in 1998